Octave Merlier (1897–1976) was an expert on the Modern Greek language.

Merlier was born in Roubaix. He studied at the Sorbonne and École pratique des hautes études under the tutelage of Antonius Meillet and Joseph Vendyres.

In 1923 he married  (Μέλπω Λογοθέτη), noted for her collection of Modern Greek folk songs.

Merlier died in Athens.

Works 
Poèmes akritiques; La mort de Digénis: tragédie, a French translation of a poem by Angelos Sikelianos.
Itinéraires de Jésus et chronologie dans le Quatrième Évangile, 1961)
(with Melpo Merlier): Ο τελευταίος ελληνισμός της Μικράς Ασίας. Έκθεση του έργου του Κέντρου Μικρασιατικών Σπουδών, 1930-1973. Κατάλογος. ("The End of Greek Asia Minor: An Exposition of the Work of the Centre for Asia Minor Studies 1930-1973: catalogue", 1974)
La vision prophétique du moine Dionysios, ou, La femme de Zante by Dionysios Solomos; French translation by Octave Merlier ("The prophetic vision of Dionysios Solomos The Monk, or the Woman of Zakynthos," 1987).

References
 Mélanges offerts à Octave et Melpo Merlier à l'occasion du 25e anniversaire de leur arrivée en Grèce. Athenis: Institut Français d'Athènes, 1956 (Collection de l'Institut Français d'Athènes, 92)
 Octavie Merlier, Octave Merlier. Un grand Français, un ami de la Grèce. Lutetiae: Les Belles Lettres, 1983

External links
Biography of Melpo Merlier (1)
Biography of Melpo Merlier (2)

1897 births
1976 deaths
People from Roubaix
Linguists from France
Modern Greek language
20th-century linguists
University of Paris alumni